Sea of Hope is a South Korean reality show program which aired on JTBC from June 29 to September 14, 2021.

Synopsis
Sea of Hope is a healing show which combines three themes: sea, bar, and wish. The cast members open a bar on the sea side and offer to the customers various food, drinks and musical acts so they can escape their daily lives for a moment. Episodes 1 to 6 take place in Pohang, the remaining episodes take place in Goseong.

Cast

Songs performed
The following is the list of songs performed at the bar in chronological order.

Ratings

International versions

References

External links
  
 

JTBC original programming
2021 South Korean television series debuts
2021 South Korean television series endings
Korean-language television shows
South Korean variety television shows
South Korean reality television series